Brian Patrick Campbell (born March 6, 1993) is an American professional golfer. 

Campbell played college golf at the University of Illinois.

Campbell finished tied for 27th and was the low amateur at the 2015 U.S. Open. He made his professional debut two weeks later at the Nova Scotia Open on the Web.com Tour.

Amateur wins
2010 ClubCorp Mission Hill Desert Junior
2013 The Macdonald Cup
2014 NCAA Sugar Grove Regional, Wolf Run Intercollegiate
2015 NCAA Noblesville Regional

Source:

Results in major championships

CUT = missed the half-way cut
"T" indicates a tie for a place
LA = Low amateur

See also
2016 Web.com Tour Finals graduates

References

External links

American male golfers
Illinois Fighting Illini men's golfers
PGA Tour golfers
Korn Ferry Tour graduates
Golfers from California
Sportspeople from Irvine, California
1993 births
Living people